Allen's squirrel (Sciurus alleni) is a tree squirrel in the genus Sciurus endemic to northern Mexico. It has no recognised subspecies.

References

Endemic mammals of Mexico
Sciurus
Mammals described in 1898
Taxonomy articles created by Polbot